Everything I Like is a 1993 Slovak drama film directed by Martin Šulík. The film was selected as the Slovak entry for the Best Foreign Language Film at the 66th Academy Awards, but was not accepted as a nominee.

Cast
 Juraj Nvota as Tomás
 Gina Bellman as Ann
 Zdena Studenková as Magda
 Jirí Menzel as Vasek
 Jakub Ursiny
 Rudolf Sloboda as Writer

See also
 List of submissions to the 66th Academy Awards for Best Foreign Language Film
 List of Slovak submissions for the Academy Award for Best Foreign Language Film

References

External links
 

1993 films
1993 drama films
Slovak-language films
Films directed by Martin Šulík
Slovak drama films